The competition Musica Nova is a competition for composers of electroacoustic music, a form of classical contemporary music, held in Prague. The competition was first held in 1969 and now features two categories of entry, one for  tape music and another for music including vocals and instrumentals.

Recipients include Jean-Claude Risset ('95), Charles L. Bestor ('96), Emil Viklický ('96), Alessandro Cipriani ('96), Robert Normandeau ('98), and Marta Jiráčková ('98).

References

Classical music awards
European music awards
Music in Prague